Jai Prakash Verma is a member of the Jharkhand Legislative Assembly. He is a member of the Bharatiya Janata Party.

References

Living people
Members of the Jharkhand Legislative Assembly
Year of birth missing (living people)
Place of birth missing (living people)
Bharatiya Janata Party politicians from Jharkhand